The 2011 BNP Paribas Polish Open was a professional tennis tournament played on hard courts. It was the first edition of the tournament which was part of the Tretorn SERIE+ of the 2011 ATP Challenger Tour. It took place in Sopot, Poland between 11 and 17 July 2011.

ATP entrants

Seeds

 1 Rankings are as of July 4, 2011.

Other entrants
The following players received wildcards into the singles main draw:
  Piotr Gadomski
  Marcin Gawron
  Andriej Kapaś
  Grzegorz Panfil

The following players received entry as a special exempt into the singles main draw:
  Nikola Ćirić
  Iván Navarro

The following players received entry from the qualifying draw:
  Dawid Celt
  Robert Godlewski
  Michal Konečný
  Maciej Smoła

Champions

Singles

 Éric Prodon def.  Nikola Ćirić, 6–1, 6–3

Doubles

 Mariusz Fyrstenberg /  Marcin Matkowski def.  Olivier Charroin /  Stéphane Robert, 7–5, 7–6(7–4)

References
Official Website

External links
ITF Search
ATP official site

BNP Paribas Polish Open
Clay court tennis tournaments
Tennis tournaments in Poland
Sport in Sopot
2011 in Polish tennis